30 Frames a Second: The WTO in Seattle 2000 is a documentary film shot during the WTO Ministerial Conference of 1999 protest activity and contains interviews with many of the protest leaders. It was directed by journalist Rustin Thompson and released in 2000.

Reception
The film garnered mostly positive reviews, receiving praise because it revealed the contradictions between the actual events, and the media coverage of the event.

It won the Gold Jury Award at the Chicago Underground Film Festival in 2000 and the PFWC Award at the Portland Festival of World Cinema in 2001.

Filming locations
Seattle

See also
 Showdown in Seattle, a 1999 documentary about the WTO protests

References

External links
 30 Frames a Second: The WTO in Seattle 2000 Official Site
 

2000 films
2000 documentary films
American documentary films
American independent films
2000s English-language films
Documentary films about globalization
Documentary films about Seattle
Documentary films about American politics
2000 independent films
2000s American films